Spinnies Aberogwen is a Nature reserve located 2 miles East of Bangor, in Gwynedd unitary authority, north west Wales. The reserve is owned and managed by North Wales Wildlife Trust.

Bangor, Gwynedd
Nature reserves in Gwynedd